The 1939 Copa del Generalísimo was the 37th staging of the Copa del Rey, the Spanish football cup competition.

The competition started on 14 May 1939 and concluded on 25 June 1939 with the final, held at the Montjuïc Stadium in Barcelona.

Round of 12

|}
Racing Santander and Donostia received a bye.

Quarter-finals

|}

Semi-finals

|}

Final

|}

External links
www.linguasport.com 
LFP website
RSSSF.com

1939
1939 domestic association football cups
Copa
Copa